Nasib Farah (born 1981), is a Danish–Somali filmmaker. He is notable as the director of critically acclaimed films My Cousin the Pirate, Warrior from the North and Lost warrior. Apart from filmmaking, he is also a journalist, translator, production manager, instructor assistant and philanthropist.

Personal life
He was born in Somalia in 1981. In 1990 he fled Mogadishu with his family after civil war broke out in Somalia. However, he missed his family while escaping and he then escaped across the border to Ethiopia, before flying to Germany and finally settled in Denmark. Initially he was an unaccompanied refugee and later grew up at the Danish Red Cross Center Avnstrup near Lejre.

He is married to a Danish woman, with whom he has kids.

Career
He trained as a salesman and worked as a freelance journalist for a few years. He later went on to create a non-profit organisation focused on helping other young Somalis through tutoring and after–school activities. Using the organisation to express his experiences, Farah started a community TV programme called 'Qaran TV' for the Somali community in Denmark.

In 2010, Farah played a leading role in the film My Cousin the Pirate, directed by Christian Sønderby Jepsen. However he always needed to work as a director rather than an actor.

In 2015, he made his maiden documentary Warriors from the North. It gained critical acclaim and was screened in several international film festivals. In 2018, he directed second documentary Lost Warrior along with Danish filmmaker Søren Steen Jespersen.

Filmography

References

External links
 

Living people
Somalian film directors
Somalian film producers
Danish documentary film directors
1982 births